Kari-Margrete Rensel Løvgren (born 1952) from Gol, living in Skien, is a secretary, and has
worked in substance abuse care, the school- and health sector. Now she does her own literary work, editing books, and text dissemination. She is married to the Norwegian writer Tor Bertel Løvgren.

Work
She published the book 'Heime' ('Home') in 2016, about her childhood on a farm in rural Hallingdal in the mountains of Norway, and her family history spanning six generations. Part of the story takes the reader to the US, with family members emigrating there in the 1870s. She also has produced and narrated books and radio series, and gives lectures in several topics such as the history of missionaries (preachers) from Hans Nilsen Hauge until the 70's in Norway and daily life in Norway in the 1900. She also does public poetry and prose readings and recently gave voice to two audiobooks. 
She and her husband run the publishing company, Serubabel Publishing.

See also
Heime Overview

Immigrants (photo history)

References

Norwegian writers
Living people
1952 births
People from Gol, Norway
People from Skien